Christian Vargas Cortés (born 16 November 1989) is a Colombian professional footballer who plays as goalkeeper for Deportes Tolima.

References

External links 
 
 

1989 births
Living people
Colombian footballers
People from Pereira, Colombia
Association football goalkeepers
Atlético Nacional footballers
Atlético Huila footballers
Atlético Bucaramanga footballers
Millonarios F.C. players
Águilas Doradas Rionegro players
Deportes Tolima footballers
Categoría Primera A players